Christos Kalantzis (Greek: Χρήστος Καλαντζής; born 1 December 1982) is a Greek retired professional footballer who played as a striker.

Honours
AEL
Greek Cup: 2006–07
Asteras Tripolis
Greek Cup runner-up: 2012–13

References

Guardian Football

External links
eleftheriaonline.gr
onsports.gr

1982 births
Living people
Greek footballers
Atromitos F.C. players
Athlitiki Enosi Larissa F.C. players
Kalamata F.C. players
A.O. Kerkyra players
Asteras Tripolis F.C. players
Association football forwards
Footballers from Kalamata